Richard Dubin is an American professor at Syracuse University.



Biography
Richard Dubin is a writer/producer/director who joined the S.I. Newhouse School of Public Communications faculty in the fall of 2000 after a long stint in network television. He has written, produced or directed primetime programs for ABC, CBS, NBC and Fox. His studio affiliations include Disney, Warner Bros., Viacom, TriStar, HBO Productions, Fox TV, MTM; and he has had long term, exclusive business relationships with MGM and Columbia Pictures Television.

Professor Dubin has been honored with many awards. For his work on the landmark CBS program, Frank's Place, he received an Emmy nomination, and both The Humanitas and Mentor Awards. He was also a Bínai Brith Humanitarian Award winner, and was named Teacher of the Year by the Newhouse Class of 2003 and again in 2008.

Prior to his television career, Professor Dubin was involved first in music and then in theater. As a professional trumpet player and protégé of Clark Terry, he appeared or recorded with, among many others, such diverse artists as Otis Redding, The Crystals, Ray Charles, Lena Horne, Tony Bennett and Dizzy Gillespie, as well as Alvin and the Chipmunks.

In the theater he participated prominently in the early Off-Off Broadway movement, acting and directing at Theater For A New City, Theater Genesis, Café Cino, Hunter Playwrights Project and La Mama. He was the co-founder and artistic director of the JazzTheater Workshop, and the director of its internationally acclaimed production, Bebop.

Concurrent with JazzTheater Workshop, Professor Dubin taught actors in his New York studio, and is a noted acting coach on both coasts. He has also been a consultant to business in the systematic application of the creative process for enhanced communication and innovation. His clients have included IBM and Beth Israel Hospital/Harvard Medical School.

His is a member of The Writers Guild of America, Directors Guild of America, American Federation of Television and Radio Artists, Screen Actors Guild, Actors' Equity Association, American Society of Composers, Authors and Publishers; and he has been elected to The Academy of Television Arts and Sciences.

Filmography
Writer
The Good News
Malcolm & Eddie
Hangin' with Mr. Cooper
Roc
The Famous Teddy Z
Frank's Place
101 Dalmatians: The Series

Director
The Famous Teddy Z
Doctor, Doctor
Frank's Place

Producer
Malcolm & Eddie
Roc
The Famous Teddy Z
Frank's Place

External links

Syracuse University Biography 

1945 births
American male screenwriters
American television writers
Living people
Writers from New York City
American male television writers
Screenwriters from New York (state)